The Netanya Stadium, commonly known as The Diamond Stadium, is a multi-use stadium in Netanya, Israel. It is used as the permanent home ground of Maccabi Netanya, and it has been used as the temporary homeground of Hapoel Hadera. The stadium also serves the Israel national football team for some select home matches, as well as the main home ground of the Israel national under-19 football team as of 2021.

History

Financing of the stadium came from the sale of the land where the old Sar-Tov Stadium was on before being demolished to be used for a housing project.

On 30 September 2003 Minister of Internal Affairs Avraham Poraz approved the plan to build the stadium in an area called Birkat Hanoun. The plan was for a 24,000-seat stadium, consisting of four separate stands.  The first two stands under construction will be the main east and west grandstands. It will house 36 private boxes, a VIP section and the press areas.  This will be followed by construction of the remaining stands, along with training grounds.

Spread out over 163 dunams (16.3 hectares), the entire complex was planned to be connected by train and have a parking lot for around 1,000 cars. The architects of the stadium were from GAB (Goldschmidt Arditty Ben Nayin) Architects, one of Israel's leading sport architecture firms based in Jerusalem. Construction was managed by the Netanya Development Company, who handled planning of the project for three years before construction.

Construction began in 2005 and the stadium officially opened on October 30, 2012. The first game was played on November 4, 2012, in front of a sold-out crowd as Maccabi Netanya defeated Hapoel Tel Aviv 2–1. Netanya's Ahmad Saba'a became the first player to score a goal in the new stadium.
The stadium hosted the 2012–13 Israel State Cup finals in front of 8,621 people. A week later the Youth State Cup finals were held in the stadium in front of 4,600 people.

It was one of four venues for the 2013 UEFA European Under-21 Football Championship, holding three group matches and a semi-final.
It was also one of four stadiums to host the 2015 UEFA European women's under-19 Football Championship and the final of the tournament.

The stadium played host to two open day and the championship game of the 2018 World Lacrosse Championship.

The first friendly match of the Israel national football team was played on February 6, 2013. Israel hosted the Finland national football team and won the match by a score of 2–1.

Average attendance

International matches

See also
Sports in Israel

References

Football venues in Israel
Maccabi Netanya F.C.
Sports venues in Central District (Israel)
Sport in Netanya
Lacrosse venues
Sports venues completed in 2012
2012 establishments in Israel